"Troy" is a song by Irish singer-songwriter Sinéad O'Connor from her debut studio album The Lion and the Cobra (1987). It was released by Chrysalis Records as the lead single from The Lion and the Cobra in 1987. Written by O'Connor, the lyric is based on the poem No Second Troy by William Butler Yeats. In 2002, a dance version of the song was released as "Troy (The Phoenix from the Flame)", becoming a top-ten hit on several international dance charts, including the US Dance Club Songs chart.

Critical reception
AllMusic editor Stephen Thomas Erlewine noted in his review that songs like "Troy", "Jackie" and "Jerusalem" "are compelling because of their hushed, quiet intensity". Mark Richardson from Pitchfork described the song as an "epic and visceral psychodrama", adding it is "lushly orchestrated, painting the story of desire and betrayal on a wall-sized canvas". Sal Cinquemani from Slant wrote: "...the fierce melodrama of young love and betrayal is imbued with the surrounding violence in 'Troy,' the song's crumbling romance equated with the burning of the famous Greek city." He added the song "is, perhaps, the album's defining moment, exhibiting all of the traits—vulnerability, fury, conviction, theatricality—the infamously outspoken singer-songwriter would become known for in the years that followed".

Music video
The video featured O'Connor, completely bald and covered with gold and silver body paint, singing to a background of moving images including flames. The building featured in several shots is on Montpelier Hill, just south of Dublin, known as the Hell Fire Club.

Live performances
O'Connor sang "Troy" live only during the year after it was released, subsequently refusing to do so  until 2008, when she performed at the Night of the Proms in Belgium and the Netherlands.

"In Dublin I was doing this show one night," she recalled, "and somebody yelled out, 'Troy, Troy.' And I went, I'm fucking troying."

Charts

Weekly charts

Year-end charts

References

External links
Lyrics at songtexte.com

Sinéad O'Connor songs
2002 singles
1987 debut singles
Pop ballads
Songs written by Sinéad O'Connor
1987 songs
Chrysalis Records singles
Adaptations of works by W. B. Yeats